Houyan may refer to:

 Houyan Station, a station on line 3 of the Dalian Metro
 Hòuyàn, also known as Later Yan, a former state located in modern-day northeast China during the era of Sixteen Kingdoms